is a railway station in the city of Nishio, Aichi, Japan, operated by Meitetsu.

Lines

Station layout
The station has one elevated side platform serving a single bi-directional track and the station building underneath. The station has automated ticket machines, Manaca automated turnstiles and is unattended.

Adjacent stations

Station history
It was renamed to its present name on May 1, 1944 when the Hekikai Railway merged with the Meitetsu Group. The tracks were elevated in July 1989.

Passenger statistics
In fiscal 2017, the station was used by an average of 278 passengers daily (boarding passengers only).

Surrounding area
Nishio Municipal Hospital

See also
 List of Railway Stations in Japan

References

External links

 Official web page 

Railway stations in Japan opened in 1928
Railway stations in Aichi Prefecture
Stations of Nagoya Railroad
Nishio, Aichi